Neil Nicholas Savaryn, O.S.B.M. (19 May 1905 in Staryi Sambir, Austro-Hungarian Empire (present-day Lviv Oblast, Ukraine) – 8 January 1986 in Edmonton, Canada) was a Ukrainian-born Canadian Ukrainian Greek Catholic hierarch. He served as the titular bishop of Ios and auxiliary bishop of Apostolic Exarchate of Canada from 3 April 1943 until 19 January 1948 and as the first eparchial bishop of Ukrainian Catholic Eparchy of Edmonton from 19 January 1948 until his death on 8 January 1986 (until 10 March 1951 with title of Apostolic Exarch of Western Canada and until 3 November 1956 with title of Apostolic Exarch of Edmonton).

Life
Savaryn was born in the family of Vasyl and Anna (née Syherych) Savaryn in Halychyna. After the school and gymnasium education, he subsequently joined the Order of Saint Basil the Great on August 28, 1922, where he made a profession on July 3, 1924, and a solemn profession on September 14, 1930. Savaryn was ordained as a priest on August 23, 1931, after completed philosophical and theological studies in the Basilian Theological Seminary.

In 1932 he arrived to Canada as Hegumen of the monastery in Mundare and professor at the Basilian Institutes in Canada.

On April 3, 1943, Savaryn was nominated by Pope Pius XII and on July 1, 1943 consecrated to the Episcopate as the titular bishop of Ios and auxiliary bishop of Apostolic Exarchate of Canada. The principal consecrator was Archbishop Basil Ladyka.

Savaryn founded eparchial museum and library and died on January 8, 1986, at the age 80.

References

1905 births
1986 deaths
People from Staryi Sambir
People from the Kingdom of Galicia and Lodomeria
Ukrainian emigrants to Canada
Naturalized citizens of Canada
Canadian Eastern Catholic bishops
20th-century Eastern Catholic bishops
Bishops of the Ukrainian Greek Catholic Church
Canadian members of the Ukrainian Greek Catholic Church
Order of Saint Basil the Great
Participants in the Second Vatican Council